USS Taylor (FFG-50), an , was a ship of the United States Navy named for Commander Jesse J. Taylor (1925–1965), a naval aviator who was awarded the Navy Cross posthumously for his heroism in the Vietnam War.

Construction
Taylors keel was laid down by Bath Iron Works Corp., Bath, Maine, on May 5, 1983. She was launched November 5, 1983, and commissioned December 1, 1984 in Bath, Maine. Taylor was sponsored by Barbara A. Taylor, the widow of the ship's namesake, and Diane Taylor-Oeland as matron of honor.

History
Taylor was homeported in Charleston, South Carolina, was part of Destroyer Squadron 6 "Greyhounds", from 1985 to 1993. The ship deployed to Northern Europe as part of the Standing Naval Forces Atlantic in 1987, and the Persian Gulf in 1988 and 1990. She participated in Operation Earnest Will and Operation Prime Chance. In 1993, Taylor changed homeport to Mayport, Florida, with the closing of Charleston Naval Station. Up to 2015, Taylor was homeported at Naval Station Mayport, and was part of Destroyer Squadron 14.

In August 2008, Taylor entered the Black Sea conducting a pre-planned routine visit to the region to interact and exercise with NATO partners Romania and Bulgaria. It joined ships from Poland, Germany and Spain.

In September 2010, Taylor was buzzed by a Russian Tu-95 bomber. However, as of 2004, all significant anti-aircraft capability was deleted from this class. On January 8, 2014, Taylor left Naval Station Mayport for her last seven-month deployment to the U.S. 5th and 6th Fleets.

On February 12, 2014, Taylor ran aground while mooring in Samsun, Turkey, during operations supporting the 2014 Winter Olympics. "A senior Turkish port official said the ship's propeller scraped the surface as it was mooring at Samsun."  The ship's skipper, Commander Dennis Volpe, was subsequently relieved and reassigned.

Republic of China Navy 
Taylor was decommissioned on May 8, 2015, and subsequently transferred to Taiwan, where the ship was commissioned by the Republic of China Navy as ROCS Ming-chuan (銘傳, PFG-1112) on November 8, 2018.

References

External links 

 
 

 

1983 ships
Oliver Hazard Perry-class frigates of the United States Navy
Ships built in Bath, Maine